Bodinayakkanur railway station is a railway station on Madurai–Bodinayakkanur branch line, serving the town of Bodinayakkanur in Tamil Nadu state, India. Currently it is closed, as the line is under gauge conversion, from metre to broad gauge.

The station is part of the Madurai railway division of the Southern Railway zone and connects the city to various parts of the state as well as the rest of the country.

It is one of the rare railway stations in India where all the historic Indian gauges – 610mm, 762mm, 1000mm – are used. Currently it is being converted to 1676mm broad gauge.

Location and layout 
The railway station is located off the Railway Station Road in Suburaj Nagar, Bodinayakkanur.

Lines 
The station is the terminus of Madurai–Bodinayakkanur line. Currently it is under gauge conversion from metre gauge to broad gauge. The metre-gauge tracks have already been removed.

History 
Teni Junction railway station was inaugurated on 1909 as a Light railway line (610mm), later that line was closed due to World War I in 1915. Later in 1942, during the Second World War, the line was closed and the tracks were removed. After India's Independence, between 1953 and 1954, the track was restored.

The Madurai–Bodinayakkanur line was sanctioned for gauge conversion, from metre-gauge to broad-gauge. It was closed on 1 January 2011, expecting to reopen it by 2012, but due to lack of funds, the project advanced at very slow pace. The remaining 53 km Usilampatti–Bodinayakkanur section is expected to reopen in April 2020.

During 1909 a narrow-gauge railway line existed between Kodaikanal Road railway station to Kumily Lower Camp via Nilakottai, Periyakulam, Theni, Cumbum. It had several branch lines in-between Periyakulam to Kodaikanal foothills and theni to Kottagudi. Near Kottagudi, the Kundala Valley Railway line's Topslip railway station is present at a distance of 5 km. This railway line had been closed due to World War I as well as due to poor patronage.

The current railway line alignment between Theni railway station to Bodinayakkanur railway station follows the same alignment of the old railway line alignment which is existed during 1910 between Theni to Kottagudi branch railway line. The new railway line is constructed from Theni to  later in 1928 as Madurai – Bodinayakkanur branch line, now this line is exist and is currently under gauge conversion from metre gauge to broad gauge.

Services 
As of January 2020, there are no train services.

References

External links 
 

Madurai railway division
Railway stations in Theni district
Railway terminus in India